Featuring...Eazy-E is a compilation of songs on which American rapper Eazy-E was featured, including popular songs which were featured on N.W.A. albums, as well as from other rappers such as Penthouse Players Clique, Mack 10 and Bone Thugs-n-Harmony, and from his solo albums and songs.

It was released for digital download with similar cover art and a similar track list by Priority Records on December 4, 2007, with the title Starring...Eazy-E. Track numbers 7, 9, 11 and 12 weren't on the first digital release.

Track listing

References

Eazy-E albums
2007 compilation albums
Albums produced by DJ Quik
Gangsta rap compilation albums
G-funk compilation albums
Compilation albums published posthumously